"Rock the Boat" is a song by American trio The Hues Corporation, written by Wally Holmes. "Rock the Boat" was first featured on their 1973 debut studio album Freedom for the Stallion (the single edit later appeared on certain editions of the band's 1974 second album Rockin' Soul). It was released as the third single from the album in early 1974, to follow up Stallions title song, which had peaked at number sixty-three on the Hot 100, and "Miracle Maker (Sweet Soul Shaker)" which did not chart.

Initially, "Rock the Boat" appeared as though it would also flop, as months went by without any radio airplay or sales activity. Not until the song became a disco favorite in New York did Top 40 radio finally pick up on the song, leading the record to finally enter the Hot 100 and zip up the chart to number one the week of July 6, 1974, in only its seventh week on the chart (and fourth week in the Top 40). The record also reached the top ten in the United Kingdom. "Rock the Boat" is considered one of the earliest disco songs. Some authorities proclaim it to be the first disco song to hit number one on the Billboard Hot 100 chart, while others give that distinction to "Love's Theme" by Love Unlimited Orchestra or "TSOP (The Sound of Philadelphia)" by MFSB, both chart-toppers from earlier in 1974.  The song became a gold record. It is a heavy airplay favorite on oldie and adult contemporary stations today.

Composition and recording
Holmes wrote the song for the band's first album, and started the song with the line "Ever since our voyage of love began..".  In an attempt to make it more punchy, producer John Florez suggested starting with the line "So I'd like to know where you got the notion."

The song features a lead vocal by Fleming Williams, who left The Hues Corporation shortly after the song was recorded. According to The Billboard Book of Number One Hits by Fred Bronson, the lone female member of the group, H. Ann Kelley, had originally been pegged to sing lead, but this idea was discarded out of fear that groups with female lead singers were less commercially viable. The bass player on the session was Wilton Felder, not James Jamerson as sometimes reported. Florez also brought in two other members of the Jazz Crusaders, Joe Sample on piano and Larry Carlton on guitar, as well as Jim Gordon on drums.  Wally Holmes wrote and played the trumpet line.

Producer John Florez did not like the lyrics for "Rock the Boat", calling them "trite", and it was originally made a B-side. After a riveting response from New York City's dance clubs, Florez remixed the song to boost the bass and rhythm instruments, and it was quickly re-released, becoming a smash.

The Hues Corporation member St. Clair Lee claims "It was a song that you could do anything on. You could cuddle or you could get crazy if you wanted to. It was a love song without being a love song. But, it was a Disco hit and it happened because of the discos."

Legacy
A dance to "Rock the Boat" is commonly performed at weddings and birthday parties, involving many people sitting down in a row and "rowing" a boat to the tune of the song. Particularly popular in Ireland, the dance attracted international attention after being featured on the second season of the TV series Derry Girls. A similar dance is done in parts of the United Kingdom to "Oops Up Side Your Head".

Richard Finch of KC and the Sunshine Band has said that "Rock the Boat" played a partial role in inspiring the hit "Rock Your Baby".

Charts

Weekly charts

Year-end charts

Forrest version
"Rock the Boat" was covered in 1982 by American-Dutch singer Forrest Thomas. It was a hit in the Netherlands, where it peaked at No. 7 on the Single Top 100. In the US, the song reached the top 10 of the Billboard Dance/Disco chart, at No. 9. It also peaked at number 33 in Australia. It was most successful in the UK, reaching No. 4 on the UK Singles Chart in March 1983.

A re-recording of the song was released in 1989, titled "Rock the Boat '89", produced by Marc Hartman and Sven van Veen, with remixes by Martin Boer.

Other versions
In 1990, British girl group Delage recorded their version, produced by the British production trio Stock Aitken Waterman. The single peaked at No. 63 on the UK Singles Chart.

References

External links
 

1973 songs
1974 singles
Disco songs
Hues Corporation songs
1982 debut singles
Forrest (singer) songs
1990 singles
Billboard Hot 100 number-one singles
Cashbox number-one singles
RPM Top Singles number-one singles
RCA Records singles
Songs about boats